Turquoise Partners (Persian: گروه مالی فیروزه‎) is a privately-owned international financial services group based in Iran which was established in 2005. Turquoise provides a wide range of financial services to foreign and domestic clients. The company is considered a pioneer in terms of managing foreign assets on the Tehran Stock Exchange. Turquoise is the largest manager of foreign portfolio investment on Iran's capital markets.

Background 
Turquoise Partners is a leading privately-owned financial services group that is focused on Iran. It offers asset management, brokerage, and investment banking services for domestic and foreign clients. It is also active in private equity and venture capital. Turquoise produces a monthly English-language newsletter called Iran Investment Monthly, which has a large online audience. Turquoise Partners was founded in 2005 and has over 250 employees.

International Funds 
Iran Equity Fund and Iran Fixed Income Fund:

Turquoise's Iran equity fund was launched in 2006 and is the largest international equity fund on the Iranian capital markets with the longest track record for foreign investors. Turquoise also launched an international fixed income fund focused on listed Iranian debt instruments.

International Corporate Finance and Capital Market Services 
Turquoise's investment banking division offers strategic advisory services to foreign and domestic clients, including market entry strategy, mergers and acquisitions, joint ventures, and corporate valuations. It also offers capital market advisory services, including debt capital markets, equity capital markets, private placements, fund structuring, and real estate advisory. After the JCPOA nuclear agreement, Turquoise was advising European and Asian corporates who were looking to enter the Iran market. In recent years, Turquoise has advised flagship Iranian startups in their fundraising and M&A activities.

Firouzeh Asia Brokerage 
Turquoise is a majority shareholder of a fully licensed Iranian brokerage firm, Firouzeh Asia. This joint venture between Turquoise and Iran's largest private sector insurance company, Asia Insurance. Firouzeh Asia offers online and offline trading platforms to its local and foreign clients. It also produces reports and analyses on the Iranian capital markets, sectors, and listed companies in English and Persian.

Tose’ Firouzeh Asset Management 
Turquoise has a local regulated asset management company, Tose’  Firouzeh Asset Management. Through this firm, Turquoise manages tailored managed accounts for its local and international clients. This firm also manages many of the Turquoise's local funds, such as:

 Firouzeh Movafaghiat Equity Fund
 Turquoise TSE30 Index ETF – Ticker: Firouzeh
 Firouzeh Fixed Income ETF – Ticker: Firouza

Venture Capital Investments 
Turquoise has seeded several venture capital investments within Iran and is known as one of the leaders in the Iranian technology ecosystem. In 2020, Turquoise launched a regulated Venture Capital Investment ETF listed on the Iran Farabourse market.

Private Equity Investments 
Turquoise has carried out proprietary investments and also investments for clients in non-listed Iranian opportunities in sectors including consumer staples, financial institutions, technology, resources, healthcare, property, and industrials, among others. In late 2020, Turquoise launched a regulated Private Equity Investment ETF, listed on the Iran Farabourse market.

Ctrl+Tech Startup Studio 
Ctrl+Tech is a Tehran-based startup studio managed by Turquoise Partners, which brings proven global concepts and implements them within Iran. Ctrl+Tech has seven live startups as of the beginning of 2019 and has the goal of launch three new ideas each year.

Partnerships 
In 2015, Charlemagne Capital in London (U.K.) and Turquoise Partners announced their partnership. Charlemagne has $2.5 billion assets under management. Together, they have set up funds in different sectors such as oil and gas, banks and retail in Iran worth $50 million.

In 2016, Turquoise announced that it will partner with Swiss bank REYL & Cie in Dubai in a $200 million Venture Capital fund focused primarily on consumer goods.

See also

Venture capital in Iran
Iranian Oil Bourse
National Development Fund

References

External links
Turquoise Partners

Investment companies of Iran
Financial services companies established in 2005